The newer Class D II engines of the Royal Bavarian State Railways (Königlich Bayerische Staatsbahn) were  goods train tank locomotives. The designation 'D II' was given to these locomotives only after all the older Class D II engines had been mustered out. Of the 73 engines that were built, 70 entered the Deutsche Reichsbahn as Class 89.6; the remaining 3 transferred to the Polish State Railways (PKP) in 1919 as Class TKh101. The majority were still working even after the Second World War. The last one was not taken out of service until 1960.

See also 
 Royal Bavarian State Railways
 List of Bavarian locomotives and railbuses

References 

0-6-0T locomotives
D 02
Standard gauge locomotives of Germany
Railway locomotives introduced in 1898
C n2t locomotives
Freight locomotives